Baba Adamu Iyam was a Nigerian soldier who served as Military Administrator of Kwara State between September 1994 and August 1996, and then Edo State from August 1996 to August 1998, during the military regime of General Sani Abacha.

Group Captain Iyam reportedly sacked 8,000 Edo state workers.
In February 1997, he halted all grants to the Edo State University since he considered that government ought not fund universities, and appointed a Sole Administrator for the university which he had a very good reason for.

References

Nigerian Air Force officers
Living people
Governors of Kwara State
Governors of Edo State
Year of birth missing (living people)